Aglaomorpha plagiata is a moth of the family Erebidae. It was described by Francis Walker in 1855. It is found in China (Yunnan), India (Himachal, Kashmir), Nepal, Bangladesh and Myanmar.

References

Moths described in 1855
Callimorphina
Moths of Asia